Tyler Christian Summers (born December 31, 1995) is an American football linebacker for the New Orleans Saints of the National Football League (NFL). He played college football at TCU, and was selected by the Green Bay Packers in the seventh round of the 2019 NFL Draft.

College career
Summers played in 51 games for the Horned Frogs starting 32. Summers recorded 317 tackles with 23.5 for a loss and 10 sacks during his college career including a career high 121 during his sophomore campaign. Summers received second-team all-Big 12 honors in 2016 and honorable mention all-Big 12 honors in 2017 and 2018.

Professional career

Green Bay Packers

Summers was drafted by the Green Bay Packers in the seventh round of the 2019 NFL Draft. On May 3, 2019, he signed his rookie contract with the Packers.

Summers entered the 2021 season as a core special teamer and backup linebacker. He was placed on injured reserve on December 24.

Summers was waived by the Packers on August 28, 2022.

Jacksonville Jaguars
Summers was claimed off waivers by the Jacksonville Jaguars on August 31, 2022. He was waived three days later and re-signed to the practice squad.

New Orleans Saints
On December 21, 2022, the New Orleans Saints signed Summers off Jacksonville's practice squad.

NFL career statistics

Regular season

Postseason

Personal life
Summers is a Christian. Summers is married to Sidnee Jo Summers. They have one son together.

References

External links
Jacksonville Jaguars bio
TCU Horned Frogs bio

1995 births
Living people
Players of American football from San Antonio
American football linebackers
TCU Horned Frogs football players
Green Bay Packers players
Jacksonville Jaguars players
New Orleans Saints players